Grischa Janorschke (born 30 May 1987) is a German former professional cyclist.

Major results

2007
 1st Prologue Thüringen Rundfahrt der U23
 9th Omloop der Kempen
2009
 3rd Tour of Seoul
2010
 1st Stage 3 Tour of Seoul
 8th Pomerania Tour
2011
 2nd Sparkassen Giro Bochum
 3rd Overall Five Rings of Moscow
 3rd Ster van Zwolle
 4th Overall Tour of Taihu Lake
 6th Overall Grand Prix of Sochi
1st Stage 1
 6th Rund um Köln
 6th Neuseen Classics
 8th ProRace Berlin
 8th Ronde van Midden-Nederland
2013
 1st  Points classification Bayern–Rundfahrt
 3rd Zuid Oost Drenthe Classic I
 4th Arno Wallaard Memorial
 5th Ronde van Noord-Holland
 6th Grand Prix of Moscow
 6th Grote Prijs Stad Zottegem
 6th Zuid Oost Drenthe Classic II
 9th ProRace Berlin
2014
 1st Stage 5 Tour of China I
 5th Horizon Park Race Maidan
2015
 6th Horizon Park Race Maidan
 7th Velothon Stockholm
 10th Horizon Park Race for Peace
 10th Rund um Sebnitz

References

External links

1987 births
Living people
German male cyclists
Universiade medalists in cycling
Universiade silver medalists for Germany
People from Lichtenfels (district)
Sportspeople from Upper Franconia
Medalists at the 2011 Summer Universiade
Cyclists from Bavaria
21st-century German people